Yalennis Castillo Ramírez (born May 21, 1986) is a Cuban judoka. She was born in Moa, Holguín, Cuba on May 21, 1986. She practiced judo since she was a child.

She first won medals in the 2005 Pan American Games and the Leonding Tournament in Austria. She won the Silver Medal in the 2006 World Cup by Teams and Bronze Medal in the 2007 World Cup in Vienna, Austria. That year 2007 she also participated in the World Championship in Rio de Janeiro, Brazil.

Her greatest result was in the 2008, where Castillo won a silver medal in the -78 kg category at the 2007 World Judo Championships in a disputed match against the local contender Xiuli Yang. During 2008 she also won the Torneo de Cuenca in Ecuador, the Tre Torri in Italy, the Super Cup of the World, in Hamburg, Germany, and the Pan American Games in Miami, USA.

Castillo was intermittently in and out of international competition due to an injury and because she married Cuban baseball player Frank Camilo Morejón and had a child. By 2014 she had returned to competition. She participated at the 2016 Summer Olympics in Rio de Janeiro. There, she lost in the quarterfinals to Anamari Velenšek from Slovenia and then lost the bronze medal match through the repechage, finishing 5th.

References

External links
 

Living people
Judoka at the 2008 Summer Olympics
Judoka at the 2016 Summer Olympics
Judoka at the 2011 Pan American Games
Olympic judoka of Cuba
Olympic silver medalists for Cuba
1986 births
Olympic medalists in judo
Medalists at the 2008 Summer Olympics
Cuban female judoka
Pan American Games bronze medalists for Cuba
Pan American Games medalists in judo
Judoka at the 2015 Pan American Games
Medalists at the 2011 Pan American Games
Medalists at the 2015 Pan American Games
20th-century Cuban women
20th-century Cuban people
21st-century Cuban women